Wisła Puławy is a Polish football club based in Puławy, Lublin Voivodeship. They compete in the third-tier II liga, having won promotion from the III liga in 2020–21.

Honours
III liga (fourth level): 2010–11, 2020–21
Lublin Polish Cup (regional level): 2008–09

2020–21 Wisła Puławy season

References

External links
 
Unofficial website 

Puławy County
Football clubs in Poland
Association football clubs established in 1923
1923 establishments in Poland
Football clubs in Lublin Voivodeship